= Thonzonium bromide =

Names
- Preferred IUPAC name N-(2-{[(4-Methoxyphenyl)methyl](pyrimidin-2-yl)amino}ethyl)-N,N-dimethylhexadecan-1-aminium bromide

Identifiers
CAS Number	553-08-2
3D model (JSmol)	Interactive image
ChEMBL	ChEMBL1200883
ChemSpider	10631
ECHA InfoCard	100.008.212
PubChem CID	11102
UNII	JI2B19CR0R
CompTox Dashboard (EPA)	DTXSID1045326
- InChI: InChI=1S/C32H55N4O.BrH/c1-5-6-7-8-9-10-11-12-13-14-15-16-17-18-27-36(2,3)28-26-35(32-33-24-19-25-34-32)29-30-20-22-31(37-4)23-21-30;/h19-25H,5-18,26-29H2,1-4H3;1H/q+1;/p-1 Key: WBWDWFZTSDZAIG-UHFFFAOYSA-M
- SMILES: [Br-].O(c1ccc(cc1)CN(c2ncccn2)CC[N+](CCCCCCCCCCCCCCCC)(C)C)C

Properties
Chemical formula	C_{32}H_{55}BrN_{4}O
Molar mass	591.723 g·mol^{−1}
- Except where otherwise noted, data are given for materials in their standard state (at 25 °C [77 °F], 100 kPa). verify (what is ?) Infobox references

Thonzonium bromide is a monocationic detergent. A solution of it is thus a surfactant and a detergent that promotes tissue contact by dispersion and penetration of the cellular debris and exudate of the containing solution.

It is used in cortisporin-TC ear drops to help penetration of active ingredients through cellular debris for its antibacterial action.
